Ngundeng Bong (c. 1830–1890) was a prophet of the Nuer people of South Sudan. He presented himself as being an earthly representative of Deng, the sky god of the Nuer religion. His prophecies of the breakup of Sudan are still a factor in the politics of modern South Sudan.

References 

1830s births
1906 deaths
Nuer people
Prophets